The name Myra was created by the 17th-century poet Fulke Greville 1st Barone Brooke (1554–1628). He possibly based it on Latin myrra meaning "myrrh" (a fragrant resin obtained from a tree).

The name may be derived from Miranda as it can be the shortened version the name Mira.

Origin and meaning
 English meaning of the name Myra for a girl: poetic invention
 Greek meaning of the name Myra for a girl: myrrh, an aromatic shrub.  Myra is associated with the same "myrrh" that, according to Matthew, was brought as a gift to the infant Jesus by the Magi, along with gold and frankincense.
 Latin meaning of the name Myra for a girl: variation of Miranda, admirable, extraordinary
 Arabic meaning of the name Myra for a girl : Aristocratic Lady
 Hebrew meaning of the name Myra for a girl : Seadew
 Biblical meaning of the name Myra for a girl : I flow, pour out, weep
 Sanskrit meaning of the name Myra for a girl : Beloved, Favorable, Admirable. 
 Japanese Kanji meaning of the name Maira 舞良: 舞 means "dance."　良 means "good."

Distribution 
The table below provides a detailed overview of the popularity of the female name Myra and variants of this in some of the countries where statistics are available.

People

Actresses
 Myra Turley, American actress
 Myra Keaton (1877–1955), American actress 
 Myra Hemmings (1895–1968), American actress 
 Myra Turley, American actress
 Myra Carter (1930–2016), American actress
 Myra De Groot (1937–1988), British actress 
 Myra Frances (1943–2021),  British actress
 Myra Singh Indian child actress

Musicians
 Myra Melford (born 1957), American jazz pianist and composer 
 Myra Taylor (singer) (1917-2011), American jazz singer and songwriter
 Myra Hess (1890–1965), British pianist
 Myra Maimoh (born 1982), Cameroon singer 
 Myra Merritt, American operatic soprano
 Myra Molloy (born 1997), Thai singer-songwriter and actress
 Myra Brooks Turner (1936-2017), American composer and music educator
 Myra Barnes, the birth name of Vicki Anderson (born 1939), American soul singer

Politics
 Myra Barry (born 1957), Irish Fine Gael politician
 Myra Jehlen, American Board of Governors Professor of English at Rutgers University in New Brunswick, New Jersey
 Myra Virginia Simmons (1880-1965), American suffragist
 Myra Freeman (born 1949), Lieutenant Governor of Nova Scotia
 Myra Ndjoku Manianga, Congo politician 
 Myra McDaniel (1932-2010), the first African American to be the Secretary of State of Texas
 Myra Tanner Weiss (1917–1997), American Trotskyist
 Myra Crownover (born 1947), American politician
 Myra C. Selby (born 1955), American former nominee to be a United States Circuit Judge 
 Myra Wolfgang (1914-1976), American labor leader and women's rights activist between the 1930s and 1970s
 Myra Sadd Brown (1872-1938), British campaigner for women's rights, an activist and internationalist
 Myra Curtis (1886–1971), British civil servant

Sports
 Myra Moller (born 1984), New Zealander cyclist
 Myra Wood, American lawn bowls international
 Myra Lakdawala, American-born former athlete for Pakistan 
 Myra Nimmo (born 1954), Scottish athlete and academic
 Myra Blackwelder (born 1955), American professional golfer

Writers
 Myra Schneider (born 1936), British poet
 Myra Sklarew (born 1934), American poet, teacher and biologist 
 Myra Morris (1893-1966), Australian poet, novelist, and writer for children
 Myra Taylor (scriptwriter) (1934-2012), British television scriptwriter
 Myra MacPherson (born 1934), American author
 Myra Kelly (1875–1910), Irish-American author and schoolteacher
 Myra Nye (1875-1955), American writer 
 Myra Bairstow, American writer
 Myra Bradwell (1831-1894), American publisher and political activist
 Myra Douglas (1844–?), American writer, poet
 Myra Sajid (born Sajid Zaki), Pakistani dramatist, playwright and scriptwriter
 Myra Orth (1934-2002), American art historian
 Myra Belle Martin (1861-?), American teacher, writer, and financier
 Myra Bradwell Helmer Pritchard (1889-1947), American writer and golfer 
 Myra Gale Brown (born 1944), American author 
 Myra Roper (1911–2002), British-born Australian author and broadcaster

Other
 Myra MacDonald, Scottish journalist
 Myra Louise Bunce (1854–1919), English designer and painter 
 Myra Bennett (1890-1990), British celebrated nurse 
 Myra Albert Wiggins (1869–1956), American painter and pictorial photographer who became a member of the important early 20th century Photo-Secession movement
 Myra Kukiiyaut (1929–2006), Inuit artist
 Myra Landau (1926-2018), Romanian-born artist and abstract painter
 Myra Juliet Farrell (1878-1957), Australian visionary, inventor and artist
 Myra Louise Taylor (1881-1939), British nursing superintendent
 Myra English (1933–2001), Hawaiian entertainer and celebrity tourism promoter
 Myra Hindley (1942–2002), English serial killer, known as  one of the perpetrators of the Moors murders
 Myra Wilson, British computer scientist
 Myra Soble (1904–1992), Russian spy
 Myra Marx Ferree (born 1949), former professor of sociology and director of the Center for German and European Studies
 Myra Hart, founder of Staples Inc.
 Myra Kinch (1904–1981), American dancer 
 Myra Knox (1853–1915), Canadian-born American physician
 Myra Kraft (1942–2011), American philanthropist
 Myra Shackley (born 1949), British professor
 Myra Reynolds (1853–1936), American literary scholar 
 Myra Reynolds Richards (1882-1934), American sculptor and teacher
 Myra Sidharta (born 1927), Chinese psychologist
 Myra Clark Gaines (1804-1885), American socialite and plaintiff
 Myra Kingman (1873-1922), American journalist
 Myra Smith Kearse (1899-1982), American physician and community leader in New Jersey
 Myra Adele Logan (1908-1977), American physician, surgeon and anatomist who was the first woman to perform open heart surgery
 Myra Butter (1925-2022), British aristocrat and thoroughbred racehorse owner

Fictional characters
 Myra McQueen, a character in Hollyoaks 
 Myra Sokolov, a character in Totally Spies!
 Myra Booth, a character in Coronation Street
 Myra Breckinridge, the name of the main character and 1968 novel by Gore Vidal
 Myra Driscoll Henshawe, a character in the 1926 novel My Mortal Enemy by Willa Carther
 Myra Castellanos, a character in the video game series The Evil Within
 Myra Licht, a character in the BBC comedy series Episodes
Myra Santelli, from Girl vs. Monster
Myra, a minor character in Divergent
Myra Menke, a character in Holes by Louis Sachar
Myra Monkhouse, a character in Family Matters

See also 
 Myra (disambiguation)

References

English feminine given names